Franklin High School is a public high school located in Reisterstown, Maryland, United States, an old historic town in the now northwestern suburbs of the modern City of Baltimore in Baltimore County, Maryland. It is in the Baltimore County Public Schools system.

Background
Currently located in Reisterstown near the intersection of Franklin Boulevard and Reisterstown Road, Franklin High has a long history. It was established on January 10, 1821 as the "Franklin Academy", a private school. The school went public in 1848, but wasn't completely under public control until 1874.  Its name was then temporarily changed to the "Reisterstown High School". By 1896, the name of the school was changed back to reflect its earlier heritage, that of "Franklin High School". It is to be considered the oldest high school in the now Baltimore County Public Schools system, and one of the oldest in the Baltimore metropolitan area and the State.

Before this time, in most of the county, prospective students, who passed the level of grammar (or elementary school) were able to travel into the central City of Baltimore if they wanted to continue on into public high schools. The more advanced and heavily populated City had been pushed by progressive and enlightened citizens and voters who went to the Maryland General Assembly which authorized the Baltimore City government in 1825 to establish a system of free public education and schools.

This was finally begun by the resolutions and ordinances of the Baltimore City Council and signed by the Mayor of Baltimore in 1829, which were the first in the State.  Four grammar schools were initially established that year, two in each side of the city, with one for boys and one for girls. Within a few more years, additional grammar schools were created in various corners of town.

Ten years later, in March 1839, the city council authorized the establishment of a new higher type of school, which had already been established in Boston and Philadelphia, and soon spread throughout their respective states of Massachusetts and Pennsylvania, that of the "Public High School".. In October 1839, the "High School" for Baltimore opened with 46 boy students and one teacher/professor in a rented townhouse on Courtland Street (now St. Paul Street and Place) near East Saratoga Streets (now the location of "Preston Gardens" and nearby Mercy Hospital, now Mercy Medical Center) The High School moved several times in its first five years, and finally settled  and went through three major sites/buildings in its now 175-year history. It changed names too, first becoming the "Male High School" when two additional public high schools for females were established in 1844, a few months apart in opposites sides of the city, known as Eastern and Western.  In the 1850s, the Male High School became known as the "Central High School of Baltimore", until 1866, when the City Council authorized its final name of the "Baltimore City College" (B.C.C. or "City College" or "City"). For a number of decades in the late 19th century, the now B.C.C. served as both high school and an early sort of "junior" or "community college".  Its curriculum, faculty and academic standards were much more advanced than most of today's high schools although only a small percentage of the teen-age population were able to go because of poverty or work conditions before the era of "compulsory education" school laws.

Many students, however, from the county's rural farms and villages traveled by horseback, horse and buggy or cart, wagon, or the new "streetcar" system, with its rails reaching out all over the area by the early 20th century, when they were electrified and rode on rails.  The math-science and engineering/technical high school was established a half-century later in 1883, as he "Baltimore Manual Training School", which was later changed a decade later to its current famous name, the "Baltimore Polytechnic Institute" ("Poly" or BPI).

A "Colored" High School and Grammar School" was also finally established in 1883 after a long battle from the city's large Afro-American population which had gotten an earlier advance of some grammar public schools for their people after 1865, expanding the small, racially segregated school system, although at first with white teachers. Another decade of agitation was required before "colored" teachers were admitted to the BCPS. Later by 1925, the "Colored High School" was renamed "Frederick Douglass High School", then located in West Baltimore at several locations since the founding then settling in at Carey and Baker Streets.  It was joined after 1937 by "Paul Laurence Dunbar Community High School" in East Baltimore and Orleans Street near North Central Avenue. Around 1925, also a "Colored" Vocational High School was started in several "hand-me-down" buildings until 1955 when a new, well-equipped structure was built at Presstman Street near North Bentalou Street, also in West Baltimore for the newly renamed  "George Washington Carver Vocational-Technical High School".

The few African-American students from Baltimore County, who could afford the carfare or somehow otherwise get to the city, had to attend the city's "Negro" high schools: Douglass, Dunbar or Carver all the way until the 1930s and 1940s until their own "George Washington Carver High School" in Towson was established for the county's blacks, generally then concentrated in East Towson or several other small villages scattered around the county.

Baltimore County was established in 1659 and originally included most of northeast Maryland. Eventually over the next two centuries, several other counties had been cut off and separated, including: Harford, Cecil, Carroll, and Howard It had two county seats in the late 1600s and early 1700s known as "Old Baltimore" on the Bush River, near the Chesapeake Bay, (in modern Harford County). Then Joppa, in northeastern Baltimore County. The City which had been founded earlier in 1729 as "Baltimore Town", and incorporated as a city in 1797, (following the merger of three small villages: "Baltimore Town", "Jones' Town" and "Fell's Point"). Baltimore City had served as the third county seat with both city and county courts, sheriffs and single joint city/county jail, from 1767 to 1851, whereupon with the adoption that year of the Maryland Constitution of 1851, Baltimore City was separated and became an independent city with the same status as the other 23 counties of State of Maryland.  The county seat was then chosen to be Towsontown after a referendum/election by the voters in 1853.  Construction of a new courthouse, (the center part of the present County Courts complex) began in 1854 with also a county jail and an "almshouse" required by constitutional mandate.

The original Franklin Academy private school building was built on Cockeysmill Road, where the Reisterstown branch of the Baltimore County Public Library is now located.  In 1905, a new building was built for the public high school, leaving the old Academy building to be used for the elementary school, the now developing system of the Baltimore County Public Schools.  An additional building was built in 1914, and another in 1930 to house the growing student population.  Of these three buildings, only the 1914/1930 brick structure still stands on Main Street in Reisterstown, currently housing Franklin Middle School.  Franklin High School was moved to a more modern building in 1960 about a mile down the road, where it remains to this day.  Since 1960, two additions have been built, the most recent in 2000 to deal with the increasing severe overcrowding.

Academics
Franklin High school received a 51.6 out of a possible 90 points (57%) on the 2018-2019 Maryland State Department of Education Report Card and received a 3 out of 5 star rating, ranking in the 42nd percentile among all Maryland schools.

Students
The 2019–2020 enrollment at Franklin High School was 1511 students.

Athletics
Franklin High School has won the following State Championships:

State Championships
Football
Class 3A 2013, 2014, 2018
Boys Basketball
Class B 1948
Girls Indoor Track
3A 2015, 2017, 2018
Wrestling
2A-1A 1999
Baseball
Class A 1985
Softball
Eugene Robertson Sportsmanship Award 2008

Notable alumni

 Nancy R. Stocksdale - Member of the Maryland House of Delegates.

 Moose Haas - a former professional baseball player who pitched in the Major Leagues from 1976 to 1987.
Tre Avery - Current football cornerback for the NFL’s Tennessee Titans
 Thomas Rowe Price Jr. - founder of the company T. Rowe Price
 Amit Mehta -  the first Asian American to serve as a US Federal Judge.
 Jean Worthley -  naturalist and former host of Hodgepodge Lodge and On Nature's Trail.

References

External links
 

Public high schools in Maryland
Baltimore County Public Schools
Middle States Commission on Secondary Schools
Reisterstown, Maryland